This article contains a list of conspiracy theories created and/or promoted by Donald Trump, former president of the United States.

Conspiracy theories

Attacks on political opponents

Barack Obama 
 Obama citizenship conspiracy theories, aka "Birtherism"
 Support for ISIS conspiracy theory

Hillary and Bill Clinton 
 Clinton body count conspiracy theory
 Epstein didn't kill himself
 Suicide of Vince Foster
 Murder of Seth Rich

Ted Cruz 
 Assassination of John F. Kennedy - alleged Rafael Cruz, the father of Texas Senator and Republican presidential candidate for the 2016 elections Ted Cruz, had ties to Lee Harvey Oswald.

Joe Biden 
Biden–Ukraine conspiracy theory
 Osama bin Laden death conspiracy theories, specifically claiming Biden and Obama staged killing with body double

Kamala Harris 
 Harris citizenship conspiracy theories

Joe Scarborough 
 Joe Scarborough murder conspiracy

Claims about clandestine opposition

Deep State 
 Accusations against a "deep state" resisting Trump administration objectives and proper prosecution of Trump foes
 Expressions of support for QAnon adherents

Antifa 
 Attribution of Buffalo police shoving incident to Antifa

Russia investigation counter-narratives 

 Allegations of Obama spying on Trump, including Spygate and Trump Tower wiretapping allegations
 Allegations of Hillary Clinton spying on Trump
 Ukrainian responsibility for election interference

Voter fraud allegations 

Trump's false claim of a stolen election
 Italygate
 Stop the Steal
 Voter impersonation
 Claimed he won the popular vote during the 2016 presidential election, saying "I think there was tremendous cheating in California, there was tremendous cheating in New York and other places".

Claims of corrupt science, medicine or statistics 

 COVID-19 deaths systematically overcounted
 Global warming conspiracy theory
 Hurricane Maria death toll controversy
 Mob responsible for movement against asbestos
 Vaccines cause autism
 Wind turbines cause cancer

Amplifying threat of immigrants and people of color 

 Alleged actions by Muslims as claimed by Britain First
 Claimed to have witnessed Muslims in Jersey City cheering the 9/11 terrorist attack
 Syrian refugee as ISIS members conspiracy
 Mexican government forces criminals across border
 White-nationalist conspiracy theory involving murder of white South African farmers and expropriation of their land

Claims of wealthy funders of protestors 

 Suggested violent protestors were being funded by "some very stupid rich people"
 Alleged Antifa activists were being funded by the Democrats, George Soros or "other people".

Questioning terrorist incidents 
 9/11 conspiracy theories

Conspiracy theorists 
Donald Trump has encouraged individuals who promote conspiracy theories.

 Alex Jones, publisher of InfoWars, a climate change denialist who has said that the World Bank invented the "hoax" of climate change and who also falsely claims that vaccines cause autism
 Paul Joseph Watson, who worked for Alex Jones' InfoWars and whose conspiracy theory interests include chemtrails, the New World Order and the Illuminati.
 Laura Loomer, who has made false claims about several U.S. mass shootings, including that they were affiliated with ISIS or that the shootings were entirely staged
 Jack Posobiec, known promoting the Pizzagate conspiracy theory.
 Sidney Powell, an attorney who joined the Trump legal team in 2020, although the team distanced itself from her after she publicly claimed that the 2020 election had been rigged by an elaborate international communist plot. She filed and lost four federal cases, alleging voter fraud of "biblical" proportions and claiming that voting machines had been secretly programmed to switch votes from Trump to Biden.
 Rudy Giuliani, the former Mayor of New York City during the September 11 attacks, best known in more recent years for his role as Donald Trump's attorney in various lawsuits pertaining to and a leading proponent of conspiracy theories about the 2020 presidential election, such as that between 65,000 and 165,000 ballots in Georgia were illegally cast by underage voters, that between 32,000 and "a few hundred thousand" illegal immigrants voted in Arizona, and that from 8,021 to 30,000 votes in Pennsylvania were cast fraudulently by people voting in the names of deceased persons whose names had yet to be purged from voter rolls.
 L. Lin Wood, an attorney who promoted conspiracy theories about the 2020 presidential election,  claiming that Trump had won the election with 70% of the vote, and that a secret cabal of international communists, Chinese intelligence, and Republican officials had contrived to steal the election from Trump.
 Kelly Townsend, an Arizona Senator sought out Trump in 2011 pushing the Obama birther conspiracy. Townsend along with Roger Stone associate Jerome Corsi, Sheriff Joe Arpaio, and 2020 Maricopa County Sheriff candidate and then chief Arpaio staffer Jerry Sheridan, worked with informant Dennis Montgomery. In 2020, Townsend worked again with Jerome Corsi claiming the election was stolen from Donald Trump and emailed Corsi a document of Arizona Senators endorsing Trump electors for Vice President Pence, in an attempt to overturn the 2020 election. In November 2020, Townsend assisted Sidney Powell along with her birther conspiracy associate Dennis Montgomery who back in 2011 alleged Hammer and Scorecard was spying and used to hack into government computers and change Obamas birth certificate, and in 2020 with Townsend and Powell shifted his claims stating the supercomputer was being used to hack and flip votes in favor of Biden in 2020, and Townsend was listed as a key witness in Powell's Arizona election fraud case. In the lead up to January 6, 2021, Townsend sponsored a bill that would designate Trump electors to Arizona and promoted the Arizona audit and stolen election claims.
Rick Wiles, founder of TruNews was granted press credentials by the Trump Administration.  Wiles is known for pushing homophobic and anti-semitic conspiracy theories, including that the Jews seek to take control of the United States to "kill millions of Christians" and stated, "9/11 wasn't done by the Muslims. It was done by a wildcard, the Israeli Mossad, that's cunning and ruthless and can carry out attacks on Americans and make it look like Arabs did it.". In July 2018, during the Trump Administration, he claimed that Anderson Cooper and Rachel Maddow were going to lead a "homosexual coup on the White House" that would result in the nationally televised decapitation of the Trump family on the White House lawn.

See also 
Veracity of statements by Donald Trump

References

Conspiracy theories
 
Donald Trump controversies
Trump administration controversies
2010s controversies in the United States
2020s controversies in the United States
Trumpism